The 2013 Hall of Fame Tennis Championships was a men's tennis tournament played on outdoor grass courts. It was the 38th edition of the Hall of Fame Tennis Championships, and was part of the ATP World Tour 250 series of the 2013 ATP World Tour. It took place at the International Tennis Hall of Fame in Newport, Rhode Island, United States, from July 8 through July 14, 2013. Unseeded Nicolas Mahut, who received a wildcard for the main draw, won the singles title.

Singles main draw entrants

Seeds 

 1 Seedings are based on the rankings of June 24, 2013

Other entrants 
The following players received wildcards into the singles main draw:
  Prakash Amritraj
  Stefan Kozlov
  Nicolas Mahut

The following players received entry from the qualifying draw:
  Adrien Bossel
  Jan Hernych 
  Alex Kuznetsov
  Ante Pavić

Withdrawals 
Before the tournament
  Brian Baker
  Federico Delbonis

Retirements
  Marinko Matosevic (food poisoning)

Doubles main draw entrants

Seeds 

 Rankings are as of June 24, 2013

Other entrants 
The following pairs received wildcards into the doubles main draw:
  Prakash Amritraj /  Sam Querrey
  Chris Harrison /  Ryan Harrison
The following pair received entry as alternates:
  Eduardo Gil /  Krasimir Kolev

Withdrawals 
Before the tournament
  Ryan Harrison (back injury)
During the tournament
  Sam Querrey (elbow injury)

Finals

Singles 

  Nicolas Mahut defeated  Lleyton Hewitt, 5–7, 7–5, 6–3

Doubles 

  Nicolas Mahut /  Édouard Roger-Vasselin defeated  Tim Smyczek /  Rhyne Williams,  6–7(4–7), 6–2, [10–5]

References

External links 
 

 
Hall of Fame Tennis Championships 
Hall of Fame Open